Atopochilus pachychilus is a species of upside-down catfish endemic to the Democratic Republic of the Congo where it occurs in the Lubilonji River in the vicinity of Kanda Kanda.  This species grows to a length of  TL.

References

pachychilus
Freshwater fish of Africa
Fish of the Democratic Republic of the Congo
Endemic fauna of the Democratic Republic of the Congo
Taxa named by Jacques Pellegrin
Fish described in 1924